Muszyński is a surname. Notable people with the surname include:

 Henryk Muszyński (born 1933), Polish Roman Catholic archbishop
 Marek Muszyński (born 1947), Polish politician
 Nick Muszynski (born 1998), American basketball player
 Wojciech Muszyński (born 1972), Polish historian and researcher

Polish-language surnames